The Ennead was a group of nine deities in Egyptian mythology worshipped at Heliopolis.

Ennead ('group of 9') may also refer to:

 Enneads, or The Six Enneads, the collection of writings of the philosopher Plotinus
 The Ennead (novel), by Jan Mark, 1978
 Ennead Architects, an American architectural firm

See also
 9
 Octad (disambiguation) ('group of 8')
 Decad (disambiguation) ('group of 10')
 Enneagram (disambiguation)
 Enneagon, or nonagon, a nine-sided polygon
 Aeneid, a Latin epic poem by Virgil
 Eneados, a translation into Middle Scots